The 2007–08 LEN Women's Champions' Cup was the 21st edition of LEN's premier competition for women's water polo clubs, running from 29 November 2007 to 26 April 2008. Orizzonte Catania defeated NC Vouiagmeni to win its eighth title. Defending champion Fiorentina Waterpolo and ZVL Leiden also reached the newly introduced final four, which replaced the previous editions' round-robin final stage.

First qualifying round

Group A

Group B

Group C

Group D

Second qualifying round

Group A

Group B

Group C

Group D

Quarter-finals

Final four
 Catania

References

LEN Euro League Women seasons
Women, Euro League
LEN women champions cup
LEN women champions cup
LEN
LEN